John King, 2nd Baron King, FRS (13 January 1706 – 10 February 1740) was an English politician.

Biography
King was born in London in 1706, the son of Peter King, 1st Baron King, the future Lord Chancellor. He attended Clare College at Cambridge University, and was awarded his M.A. in 1723. He was Member of Parliament for Launceston from 1727 to 1734 and for Exeter from 1734 until he succeeded to the peerage in 1735. He was made Out-ranger of Windsor Forest in 1726. He married Elizabeth, the daughter of Robert Fry, Esq., of Devon: they had no issue. King died in 1740 on a journey to Lisbon. He was succeeded by his brother Peter King, 3rd Baron King.

References

King, John King, 2nd Baron
King, John King, 2nd Baron
Members of the Parliament of Great Britain for Exeter
John
Fellows of the Royal Society
Members of the Parliament of Great Britain for Launceston
British MPs 1727–1734
British MPs 1734–1741
Freemasons of the Premier Grand Lodge of England